Homalopetalum is a genus of flowering plants from the orchid family, Orchidaceae. It contains 8 known species native to Central America, northern South America, Mexico and the West Indies.

Homalopetalum alticola (Garay & Dunst.) Soto Arenas - Venezuela
Homalopetalum hypoleptum (Lindl.) Soto Arenas - Brazil
Homalopetalum kienastii (Rchb.f.) Withner - Mexico
Homalopetalum leochilus (Rchb.f.) Soto Arenas - Cuba, Dominican Republic
Homalopetalum pachyphyllum (L.O.Williams) Dressler - Mexico
Homalopetalum pumilio (Rchb.f.) Schltr. - Mexico, Central America, Ecuador
Homalopetalum pumilum (Ames) Dressler - Mexico
Homalopetalum vomeriforme (Sw.) Fawc. & Rendle - Cuba, Jamaica

See also 
 List of Orchidaceae genera

References 

 Pridgeon, A.M., Cribb, P.J., Chase, M.A. & Rasmussen, F. eds. (1999). Genera Orchidacearum 1. Oxford Univ. Press.
 Pridgeon, A.M., Cribb, P.J., Chase, M.A. & Rasmussen, F. eds. (2001). Genera Orchidacearum 2. Oxford Univ. Press.
 Pridgeon, A.M., Cribb, P.J., Chase, M.A. & Rasmussen, F. eds. (2003). Genera Orchidacearum 3. Oxford Univ. Press
 Berg Pana, H. 2005. Handbuch der Orchideen-Namen. Dictionary of Orchid Names. Dizionario dei nomi delle orchidee. Ulmer, Stuttgart

External links 

Laeliinae genera
Laeliinae